The following species in the flowering plant genus Lupinus, the lupins or lupines, are accepted by Plants of the World Online. Although the genus originated in the Old World, about 500 of these species are native to the New World, probably due to multiple adaptive radiation events.

Lupinus aberrans 
Lupinus acopalcus 
Lupinus adinoanthus 
Lupinus adsurgens 
Lupinus affinis 
Lupinus agardhianus 
Lupinus alaimandus 
Lupinus alaristatus 
Lupinus albert-smithianus 
Lupinus albescens 
Lupinus albicaulis 
Lupinus albifrons 
Lupinus albosericeus 
Lupinus albus 
Lupinus alcis-montis 
Lupinus aliamandus 
Lupinus aliattenuatus 
Lupinus alibicolor 
Lupinus alimanens 
Lupinus alinanus 
Lupinus alipatulus 
Lupinus alirevolutus 
Lupinus alivillosus 
Lupinus allargyreius 
Lupinus alopecuroides 
Lupinus altimontanus 
Lupinus altiplani 
Lupinus alveorum 
Lupinus amabayensis 
Lupinus amandus 
Lupinus amboensis 
Lupinus ammophilus 
Lupinus amnis-otuni 
Lupinus ampaiensis 
Lupinus amphibius 
Lupinus ananeanus 
Lupinus anatolicus 
Lupinus andersonii 
Lupinus andicola 
Lupinus andinus 
Lupinus angustiflorus 
Lupinus angustifolius 
Lupinus antensis 
Lupinus antoninus 
Lupinus apertus 
Lupinus appositus 
Lupinus aralloius 
Lupinus arboreus 
Lupinus arbustus 
Lupinus arbutosocius 
Lupinus archeranus 
Lupinus arcticus 
Lupinus arenarius 
Lupinus arequipensis 
Lupinus argenteus 
Lupinus argurocalyx 
Lupinus aridulus 
Lupinus aridus 
Lupinus ariste-josephi 
Lupinus arizelus 
Lupinus arizonicus 
Lupinus arvensi-plasketti 
Lupinus arvensis 
Lupinus asa-grayanus 
Lupinus aschenbornii 
Lupinus asplundianus 
Lupinus asymbepus 
Lupinus atacamicus 
Lupinus atlanticus 
Lupinus atropurpureus 
Lupinus aureonitens 
Lupinus aureus 
Lupinus austrobicolor 
Lupinus austrohumifusus 
Lupinus austrorientalis 
Lupinus austrosericeus 
Lupinus ballianus 
Lupinus bandelierae 
Lupinus bangii 
Lupinus barbatilabius 
Lupinus barbiger 
Lupinus barkeri 
Lupinus bartlettianus 
Lupinus bartolomei 
Lupinus benthamii 
Lupinus bicolor 
Lupinus bi-inclinatus 
Lupinus bingenensis 
Lupinus blaisdellii 
Lupinus bogotensis 
Lupinus bolivianus 
Lupinus bombycinocarpus 
Lupinus boyacensis 
Lupinus brachypremnon 
Lupinus bracteolaris 
Lupinus brevecuneus 
Lupinus brevicaulis 
Lupinus brevior 
Lupinus breviscapus 
Lupinus breweri 
Lupinus bryoides 
Lupinus buchtienii 
Lupinus burkartianus 
Lupinus burkei 
Lupinus caballoanus 
Lupinus cachupatensis 
Lupinus cacuminis 
Lupinus caespitosus 
Lupinus calcensis 
Lupinus caldasensis 
Lupinus camiloanus 
Lupinus canus 
Lupinus carazensis 
Lupinus carchiensis 
Lupinus cardenasianus 
Lupinus carhuamayus 
Lupinus carlos-ochoae 
Lupinus carpapaticus 
Lupinus carrikeri 
Lupinus caucensis 
Lupinus caudatus 
Lupinus cavicaulis 
Lupinus ccorilazensis 
Lupinus celsimontanus 
Lupinus cervinus 
Lupinus cesaranus 
Lupinus cesar-vargasii 
Lupinus chachas 
Lupinus chamissonis 
Lupinus chavanillensis 
Lupinus chiapensis 
Lupinus chihuahuensis 
Lupinus chipaquensis 
Lupinus chlorolepis 
Lupinus chocontensis 
Lupinus chongos-bajous 
Lupinus christinae 
Lupinus chrysanthus 
Lupinus chrysocalyx 
Lupinus chumbivilcensis 
Lupinus citrinus 
Lupinus clarkei 
Lupinus cochapatensis 
Lupinus colcabambensis 
Lupinus colombiensis 
Lupinus compactiflorus 
Lupinus comptus 
Lupinus concinnus 
Lupinus condensiflorus 
Lupinus confertus 
Lupinus congdonii 
Lupinus conicus 
Lupinus constancei 
Lupinus convencionensis 
Lupinus cookianus 
Lupinus coriaceus 
Lupinus cosentinii 
Lupinus costaricensis 
Lupinus cotopaxiensis 
Lupinus couthouyanus 
Lupinus covillei 
Lupinus croceus 
Lupinus crotalarioides 
Lupinus crucis-viridis 
Lupinus cuatrecasasii 
Lupinus culbertsonii 
Lupinus cumulicola 
Lupinus cusickii 
Lupinus cuspidatus 
Lupinus cuzcensis 
Lupinus × cymba-egressus 
Lupinus cymboides 
Lupinus dalesiae 
Lupinus decaschistus 
Lupinus decemplex 
Lupinus decurrens 
Lupinus deflexus 
Lupinus delicatulus 
Lupinus densiflorus 
Lupinus depressus 
Lupinus diasemus 
Lupinus diehlii 
Lupinus diffusus 
Lupinus digitatus 
Lupinus disjunctus 
Lupinus dissimulans 
Lupinus dorae 
Lupinus dotatus 
Lupinus durangensis 
Lupinus duranii 
Lupinus dusenianus 
Lupinus eanophyllus 
Lupinus edysomatus 
Lupinus egens 
Lupinus ehrenbergii 
Lupinus elaphoglossum 
Lupinus elatus 
Lupinus elegans 
Lupinus elegantulus 
Lupinus ellsworthianus 
Lupinus elmeri 
Lupinus eramosus 
Lupinus erectifolius 
Lupinus eremonomus 
Lupinus eriocalyx 
Lupinus eriocladus 
Lupinus ermineus 
Lupinus espinarensis 
Lupinus evermannii 
Lupinus exaltatus 
Lupinus excubitus 
Lupinus exochus 
Lupinus expetendus 
Lupinus extrarius 
Lupinus falsomutabilis 
Lupinus falsoprostratus 
Lupinus falsorevolutus 
Lupinus famelicus 
Lupinus fiebrigianus 
Lupinus fieldii 
Lupinus filicaulis 
Lupinus fissicalyx 
Lupinus flavoculatus 
Lupinus foliolosus 
Lupinus formosus 
Lupinus fragrans 
Lupinus francis-whittieri 
Lupinus fratrum 
Lupinus fulcratus 
Lupinus gachetensis 
Lupinus garfieldensis 
Lupinus gaudichaudianus 
Lupinus gayanus 
Lupinus gentryanus 
Lupinus gibertianus 
Lupinus giganteus 
Lupinus glabratus 
Lupinus goodspeedii 
Lupinus gormanii 
Lupinus gracilentus 
Lupinus grauensis 
Lupinus grayi 
Lupinus gredensis 
Lupinus grisebachianus 
Lupinus guadalupensis 
Lupinus guaraniticus 
Lupinus guascensis 
Lupinus guggenheimianus 
Lupinus gussoneanus 
Lupinus hamaticalyx 
Lupinus hartmannii 
Lupinus haughtianus 
Lupinus hautcarazensis 
Lupinus havardii 
Lupinus hazenanus 
Lupinus heptaphyllus 
Lupinus herreranus 
Lupinus herzogii 
Lupinus hieronymi 
Lupinus hillii 
Lupinus hinkleyorum 
Lupinus hintonii 
Lupinus hintoniorum 
Lupinus hirsutissimus 
Lupinus hispanicus 
Lupinus holosericeus 
Lupinus holwayorum 
Lupinus honoratus 
Lupinus horizontalis 
Lupinus hornemannii 
Lupinus hortonianus 
Lupinus hortorum 
Lupinus howardii 
Lupinus howard-scottii 
Lupinus huachucanus 
Lupinus huancayoensis 
Lupinus huariacus 
Lupinus huaronensis 
Lupinus huigrensis 
Lupinus humifusus 
Lupinus hyacinthinus 
Lupinus idoneus 
Lupinus ignobilis 
Lupinus imminutus 
Lupinus insulae 
Lupinus interruptus 
Lupinus intortus 
Lupinus inusitatus 
Lupinus involutus 
Lupinus × inyoensis 
Lupinus jahnii 
Lupinus jaimehintonianus 
Lupinus jamesonianus 
Lupinus james-westii 
Lupinus jean-julesii 
Lupinus jelskianus 
Lupinus johannis-howellii 
Lupinus jonesii 
Lupinus jujuyensis 
Lupinus juninensis 
Lupinus kalenbornorum 
Lupinus kellermanianus 
Lupinus killipianus 
Lupinus kingii 
Lupinus klamathensis 
Lupinus kunthii 
Lupinus kuschei 
Lupinus lacus 
Lupinus laevigatus 
Lupinus lagunae-negrae 
Lupinus lanatocarpus 
Lupinus lanatus 
Lupinus lapidicola 
Lupinus latifolius 
Lupinus laudandrus 
Lupinus lechlerianus 
Lupinus ledigianus 
Lupinus lemmonii 
Lupinus lepidus 
Lupinus leptocarpus 
Lupinus leptophyllus 
Lupinus lespedezoides 
Lupinus lesueurii 
Lupinus leucophyllus 
Lupinus lindleyanus 
Lupinus linearis 
Lupinus littoralis 
Lupinus lobbianus 
Lupinus longifolius 
Lupinus longilabrum 
Lupinus lorenzensis 
Lupinus ludovicianus 
Lupinus luisanae 
Lupinus luteolus 
Lupinus lutescens 
Lupinus luteus 
Lupinus lyallii 
Lupinus macbrideianus 
Lupinus × macounii 
Lupinus macranthus 
Lupinus maculatus 
Lupinus maderensis 
Lupinus magdalenensis 
Lupinus magnificus 
Lupinus magniflorus 
Lupinus magnistipulatus 
Lupinus malacophyllus 
Lupinus malacotrichus 
Lupinus maleopinatus 
Lupinus mandonianus 
Lupinus mantaroensis 
Lupinus mariae-josephae 
Lupinus marschallianus 
Lupinus martensis 
Lupinus martinetianus 
Lupinus mathewsianus 
Lupinus matucanicus 
Lupinus mearnsii 
Lupinus meionanthus 
Lupinus melaphyllus 
Lupinus meridanus 
Lupinus metensis 
Lupinus mexiae 
Lupinus mexicanus 
Lupinus michelianus 
Lupinus microcarpus 
Lupinus microphyllus 
Lupinus minimus 
Lupinus mirabilis 
Lupinus misticola 
Lupinus mollendoensis 
Lupinus mollis 
Lupinus monserratensis 
Lupinus montanus 
Lupinus monticola 
Lupinus moritzianus 
Lupinus mucronulatus 
Lupinus muelleri 
Lupinus multiflorus 
Lupinus munzianus 
Lupinus mutabilis 
Lupinus nanus 
Lupinus neglectus 
Lupinus nehmadiae 
Lupinus neocotus 
Lupinus neomexicanus 
Lupinus nepubescens 
Lupinus nevadensis 
Lupinus nipomensis 
Lupinus niveus 
Lupinus nonoensis 
Lupinus nootkatensis 
Lupinus notabilis 
Lupinus nubigenus 
Lupinus nubilorum 
Lupinus obscurus 
Lupinus obtunsus 
Lupinus obtusilobus 
Lupinus ochoanus 
Lupinus octablomus 
Lupinus onustus 
Lupinus opertospicus 
Lupinus oquendoanus 
Lupinus oreganus 
Lupinus oreophilus 
Lupinus ornatus 
Lupinus oscar-haughtii 
Lupinus oscarii 
Lupinus otto-buchtienii 
Lupinus otto-kuntzeanus 
Lupinus otuzcoensis 
Lupinus ovalifolius 
Lupinus pachanoanus 
Lupinus pachitensis 
Lupinus pachylobus 
Lupinus padre-crowleyi 
Lupinus palaestinus 
Lupinus pallidus 
Lupinus paniculatus 
Lupinus paraguariensis 
Lupinus paranensis 
Lupinus paruroensis 
Lupinus parvifolius 
Lupinus pasachoensis 
Lupinus patulus 
Lupinus paucartambensis 
Lupinus paucovillosus 
Lupinus pearceanus 
Lupinus peirsonii 
Lupinus pendentiflorus 
Lupinus penlandianus 
Lupinus perblandus 
Lupinus perbonus 
Lupinus perennis 
Lupinus perissophytus 
Lupinus persistens 
Lupinus peruvianus 
Lupinus philippianus 
Lupinus pickeringii 
Lupinus pilosissimus 
Lupinus pilosus 
Lupinus pinguis 
Lupinus pipersmithianus 
Lupinus pisacensis 
Lupinus piurensis 
Lupinus platamodes 
Lupinus plattensis 
Lupinus platyptenus 
Lupinus polycarpus 
Lupinus polyphyllus 
Lupinus poopoensis 
Lupinus popayanensis 
Lupinus potosinus 
Lupinus praealtus 
Lupinus praestabilis 
Lupinus praetermissus 
Lupinus pratensis 
Lupinus princei 
Lupinus pringlei 
Lupinus proculaustrinus 
Lupinus prostratus 
Lupinus protrusus 
Lupinus prouvensalanus 
Lupinus prunophilus 
Lupinus × pseudopolyphyllus 
Lupinus pseudotsugoides 
Lupinus pubescens 
Lupinus pucapucensis 
Lupinus pulloviridus 
Lupinus pulvinaris 
Lupinus punto-reyesensis 
Lupinus puracensis 
Lupinus purdieanus 
Lupinus × pureriae 
Lupinus purosericeus 
Lupinus purpurascens 
Lupinus pusillus 
Lupinus puyupatensis 
Lupinus pycnostachys 
Lupinus quellomayus 
Lupinus quercuum 
Lupinus quitensis 
Lupinus radiatus 
Lupinus ramosissimus 
Lupinus reflexus 
Lupinus regnellianus 
Lupinus reitzii 
Lupinus revolutus 
Lupinus rhodanthus 
Lupinus richardianus 
Lupinus rivetianus 
Lupinus rivularis 
Lupinus romasanus 
Lupinus roseolus 
Lupinus roseorum 
Lupinus rotundiflorus 
Lupinus rowleeanus 
Lupinus ruber 
Lupinus rubriflorus 
Lupinus ruizensis 
Lupinus rupestris 
Lupinus rusbyanus 
Lupinus russellianus 
Lupinus sabinianus 
Lupinus sandiensis 
Lupinus santanderensis 
Lupinus sarmentosus 
Lupinus saxatilis 
Lupinus saxosus 
Lupinus schickendantzii 
Lupinus schumannii 
Lupinus seifrizianus 
Lupinus sellowianus 
Lupinus sellulus 
Lupinus semiaequus 
Lupinus semiprostratus 
Lupinus semperflorens 
Lupinus sericatus 
Lupinus sericeolodix 
Lupinus sericeus 
Lupinus shockleyi 
Lupinus shrevei 
Lupinus sierrae-blancae 
Lupinus simonsianus 
Lupinus simulans 
Lupinus sinaloensis 
Lupinus smithianus 
Lupinus solanagrorum 
Lupinus somaliensis 
Lupinus soratensis 
Lupinus soukupianus 
Lupinus sparsiflorus 
Lupinus spectabilis 
Lupinus splendens 
Lupinus spruceanus 
Lupinus staffordiae 
Lupinus stipulatus 
Lupinus stiversii 
Lupinus storkianus 
Lupinus subacaulis 
Lupinus subcarnosus 
Lupinus subcuneatus 
Lupinus subhamatus 
Lupinus subinflatus 
Lupinus subsessilis 
Lupinus subtomentosus 
Lupinus subvexus 
Lupinus succulentus 
Lupinus sufferrugineus 
Lupinus suksdorfii 
Lupinus sulphureus 
Lupinus summersianus 
Lupinus surcoensis 
Lupinus syriggedes 
Lupinus tacitus 
Lupinus tafiensis 
Lupinus talahuensis 
Lupinus tarapacensis 
Lupinus tarijensis 
Lupinus tarmaensis 
Lupinus tassilicus 
Lupinus tatei 
Lupinus taurimortuus 
Lupinus tauris 
Lupinus tayacajensis 
Lupinus tetracercophorus 
Lupinus texensis 
Lupinus tidestromii 
Lupinus tolimensis 
Lupinus tomentosus 
Lupinus tominensis 
Lupinus toratensis 
Lupinus tracyi 
Lupinus triananus 
Lupinus truncatus 
Lupinus tucumanensis 
Lupinus ulbrichianus 
Lupinus uleanus 
Lupinus ultramontanus 
Lupinus umidicola 
Lupinus uncialis 
Lupinus uncinatus 
Lupinus urcoensis 
Lupinus urubambensis 
Lupinus valerioi 
Lupinus vallicola 
Lupinus vargasianus 
Lupinus varicaulis 
Lupinus variicolor 
Lupinus varnerianus 
Lupinus velillensis 
Lupinus velutinus 
Lupinus venezuelensis 
Lupinus ventosus 
Lupinus verbasciformis 
Lupinus verjonensis 
Lupinus vernicius 
Lupinus versicolor 
Lupinus viduus 
Lupinus vilcabambensis 
Lupinus villosus 
Lupinus visoensis 
Lupinus volubilis 
Lupinus volutans 
Lupinus weberbaueri 
Lupinus werdermannianus 
Lupinus westianus 
Lupinus wilkesianus 
Lupinus william-lobbii 
Lupinus williamsianus 
Lupinus wyethii 
Lupinus xanthophyllus 
Lupinus xenophytus 
Lupinus yanahuancensis 
Lupinus yarushensis 
Lupinus yaulyensis 
Lupinus ynesiae

References

Lupinus